The vascular plant flora of the Cocos (Keeling) Islands consists of approximately 61 species native to the 22 vegetated islands and about 69 introduced species, most of which are confined to the two larger inhabited islands, Home Island and West Island. There are no plant species endemic to the islands; however, one variety of Pandanus tectorius, P. tectorius var. cocosensis, is only found growing on these islands. The native vegetation of the two atolls primarily consists of sea-dispersed shoreline plants of the Indo-Pacific region. On the lagoon shoreline, tall shrublands are dominated by Pemphis acidula and Cordia subcordata, often growing in monospecific stands. Closed forest stands are dominated by either Cocos nucifera or Pisonia grandis.

Much of the area of the southern islands has been modified for coconut plantations, altering the vegetation from the pre-settlement era. About half of the species on the southern atoll are introduced.

In a report to Parks Australia in 2002, of the many introduced species on the southern atoll, Chromolaena odorata (Siam weed) was identified as being the greatest threat to the environment. Most of the introduced species are pantropical herbaceous plants likely introduced to the southern atoll after the airfield was built in 1944.

History
The Cocos (Keeling) Islands are isolated, being the only atolls in the eastern Indian Ocean, and were uninhabited until relatively recently in the early 19th century. The first botanical study was done while naturalist Charles Darwin visited the southern atoll for ten days, arriving April 1, 1836. Darwin collected 21 species during his time on the islands.

Later, the Scottish botanist Henry Ogg Forbes botanised the southern islands in 1879, collecting 38 species in 22 days, followed by W. E. Birch in 1885 and the British botanist Henry B. Guppy, who spent ten weeks in 1888 on both atolls. By far the longest visit by a naturalist was that of Frederic Wood Jones who spent 15 months on the southern atoll in 1909 and published his account in the book, Coral and Atolls. A History and Description of the Keeling-Cocos Islands, with an account of their Fauna and Flora, and a Discussion of the Method of Development and Transformation of Coral Structures in General, published in 1912. The northern atoll was visited in 1941 by the British naturalist Carl Alexander Gibson-Hill, who provided the first systematic assessment of the plant communities and a description of the dominant flora. The 1980s saw the two largest surveys in 1985 by I. R. Telford, who collected 93 species from both atolls, and in 1986-1987 by D. G. Williams, who collected 130 from all islands.

Species

See also
Fauna of the Cocos (Keeling) Islands

References

External links
Flora of Pulu Keeling National Park. Department of the Environment, Australian Government.